Beringer may refer to:

Karl-Friedrich Beringer (born 1948), German choral and orchestral conductor
Beringer Vineyards
Beringer's Lying Stones, limestone carved into the shape of various animals

See also
 Behringer, a German equipment company